Yoon Jong-bin (born December 20, 1979) is a South Korean film director.

Career
Yoon Jong-bin's Chung-Ang University graduation thesis film was The Unforgiven, which portrayed masculine codes in the Korean military with honesty and sensitivity. And despite its rough edges due to technical limitations and a low budget, the film was a smash hit at the 2005 Busan International Film Festival and won several awards, including the NETPAC. It went on to travel to a number of festivals, winning awards and international critical acclaim.

His sophomore effort Beastie Boys (also known as The Moonlight of Seoul) showed another side of men -- male hosts who serve female clients in discreet salons tucked into the affluent fashion districts of southern Seoul.

In his third film Nameless Gangster: Rules of the Time, Yoon tackled corruption among prosecutors and customs officers and their collusion with the mob in 1980-1990s Busan. Unlike his first two films, Yoon's gangster saga was popular at the box office and became one of the biggest domestic hits of 2012.

Yoon further explored the themes of injustice and violence in his fourth film Kundo: Age of the Rampant, a tale of 19th-century Joseon bandits who waged war against the nobility and corrupt government officials. When asked where he drew his inspiration from, Yoon answered, "I tapped into movies that I used to love as a child. Rather than making an intellectual film, I wanted to get hearts racing." By not giving the protagonist "hero-like characteristics," Yoon said he wanted to say through the film that "it is not the special or talented people, but very ordinary people who can change the world, especially when gathered en masse."

Yoon has worked with close friend and fellow Chung-Ang University alumnus Ha Jung-woo in all four of his features.

Filmography

Feature films

Television

Awards

References

External links
 Yoon Jong-bin at Cyworld
 
 
 
 Yoon Jong-bin at Korean Film Biz Zone

South Korean male film actors
South Korean film directors
South Korean film producers
South Korean screenwriters
Chung-Ang University alumni
People from Busan
1979 births
Living people